The men's 200 metres event at the 1990 Commonwealth Games was held on 29 January and 1 February at the Mount Smart Stadium in Auckland.

Medalists

Results

Heats
Qualification: First 5 of each heat (Q) and the next 6 fastest (q) qualified for the quarterfinals.

Wind:Heat 1: ?, Heat 2: +2.3 m/s, Heat 3: +2.5 m/s, Heat 4: ?, Heat 5: ?, Heat 6: +4.8 m/s

Quarterfinals
Qualification: First 4 of each heat (Q) and the next 2 fastest (q) qualified for the semifinals.

Wind:Heat 1: +3.2 m/s, Heat 2: +2.8 m/s, Heat 3: +3.4 m/s, Heat 4: +2.5 m/s

Semifinals
Qualification: First 4 of each heat (Q) and the next 1 fastest (q) qualified for the final.

Wind:Heat 1: +2.5 m/s, Heat 2: +2.3 m/s

Final
Wind: +2.4 m/s

References

The Sydney Morning Heralde

200
1990